Amblyseius lentiginosus is a species of mite in the family Phytoseiidae.

References

lentiginosus
Articles created by Qbugbot
Animals described in 1974